Grantham Munton Yorke (14 February 1809 – 2 October 1879)  was Dean of Worcester from 1874 until his death.

Yorke was  educated at Queens' College, Cambridge  and ordained in 1835. In 1844 he became the incumbent at St Philip, Birmingham, a post he held until his elevation to the Deanery.

His daughter Constance Ellen married the Rev. William Henry Lyttelton (1820–1884).

References

1879 deaths
Alumni of Queens' College, Cambridge
Deans of Worcester
1809 births